Eshwar Bheemanna Khandre (born 15 January 1962) is an Indian politician serving as the Working President of the Karnataka Pradesh Congress Committee, since 4 July 2018. He is a Member of the Karnataka Legislative Assembly from Bhalki constituency since 25 May 2008. He was the Minister of Municipal Administration & Public Enterprises of Karnataka from 2016 to 2018 in the Siddaramaiah ministry. He was the Minister in Charge of the Bidar district.

Personal life
Khandre was born on 15 January 1962 to former minister Bheemanna Khandre and Laxmibai in Bhalki. He received a bachelor of engineering degree in 1985 from Poojya Doddappa Appa College of Engineering, Gulbarga, Gulbarga University. He is the third member of the Khandre family to be elected to the Karnataka Legislative Assembly from the district. His brother is Vijaykumar Khandre who also represented the constituency two times. Khandre is the chairman of Shantivardhak Education Society. He is an agriculturalist by profession and does social service.

Constituency
He represents the Bhalki constituency.

Political career
Khandre is a member of the Indian National Congress and KPCC working President of Karnataka State. In 2008, Khandre defeated BJP candidate Prakash Khandre by a margin of 20,971 votes. In the 2004 election, he was defeated by the BJP candidate.

References 

1962 births
People from Yadgir district
Living people
Karnataka MLAs 2008–2013
Karnataka MLAs 2013–2018
Karnataka MLAs 2018–2023
Indian National Congress politicians from Karnataka